Valguarnera Caropepe (Sicilian: Carrapipi) is a comune in Province of Enna, Sicily, southern Italy.

Founded in 1628 by Francesco Valguarnera, it saw a remarkable growth during the 19th century associated with the thriving sulfur mining industry in the area.

The Chiesa Madre dedicated to Saint Christopher and the 18th century Palazzo del Municipio (the Town Hall), in the precincts of the former Monte Frumentario, are the most attractive buildings.

Relics dating from between the 7th century BC and the 14th century AD have been unearthed in the archaeological area of Rossomanno, in the town surroundings.

References

Municipalities of the Province of Enna
Populated places established in 1628
1628 establishments in Italy